The Caldwell class was a class of six
"flush deck" United States Navy destroyers built during World War I and shortly after. Four served as convoy escorts in the Atlantic; the other two were completed too late for wartime service. Two were scrapped during the 1930s, but four survived to serve throughout World War II, three of these in service with the Royal Navy under the Destroyers for Bases Agreement and the fourth as a high speed transport.

Design and construction
The six Caldwell-class torpedo boat destroyers were authorized by Congress under the Act of 3 March 1915, "to have a speed of not less than thirty knots per hour [sic] and to cost, exclusive of armor and armament, not to exceed $925,000.00 each ...Provided, that three of said torpedo-boats herein authorized shall be built on the Pacific Coast."

Built from 1916 to 1918, the six ships of the Caldwell class were the first of 279 ordered (6 of which were cancelled) to a flush-decked design to remove the forecastle break weakness of the preceding  and other "thousand tonners". They were effectively prototypes of the mass production  and  vessels which followed them, although somewhat slower ( vs. ) and differing in some details. The forward sheer of the Caldwell class was improved to keep "A" mount from being constantly washed out; however, this was unsuccessful. The Caldwells had a cutaway stern rather than the cruiser stern of the later ships, and thus had a tighter turning radius than their successors. The armament of the Sampsons was retained, but the broadside  guns were relocated to "bandstands" aft of the bridge. There were differences in appearance; Caldwell, Craven and Manley were built with four "stacks" (funnels), while Gwin, Conner and Stockton had only three. The middle stack of the three-stack ships was wider due to combining two boiler uptakes. Once the mass-production destroyers made the design prevalent, the Caldwells and their successors became known as "flush-deck" or "four-stack" destroyers.

 was converted to a prototype high-speed destroyer transport (hull classification symbol APD) in 1939, with her forward stacks and boilers removed to give her the capacity to lift 200 Marines and four  Higgins assault boats (LCP(L), LCP(R), or LCVP). She saw action at Guadalcanal, Kwajalein, Saipan, and the Philippines.

, serving as HMS Leeds, provided cover at Gold Beach on 6 June 1944; her sisters served as convoy escorts. All three survived the war, two being sunk as targets and one scrapped, postwar.

Armament
The armament repeated that of the preceding Sampson-class of "thousand tonners", and would be retained in the subsequent mass production "flush deckers". While the gun armament was typical for destroyers of this period, the torpedo armament of twelve  torpedo tubes was larger than usual, in accordance with American practice at the time. A factor in the size of the torpedo armament was the General Board's decision to use broadside rather than centerline torpedo tubes. This was due to the desire to have some torpedoes remaining after firing a broadside, and problems experienced with centerline mounts on previous classes with torpedoes striking the gunwales of the firing ship. The Mark 8 torpedo was equipped. The "bandstand" location of the waist 4-inch guns kept the mounts dry, but restricted the firing arc.

These ships carried a  23 caliber anti-aircraft (AA) gun, typically just aft of the bow 4-inch gun. The original design called for two 1-pounder AA guns, but these were in short supply and the 3-inch gun was more effective. Anti-submarine (ASW) armament was added during World War I, or included in the initial design with DD-70 and DD-71. Typically, a single depth charge rack was provided aft, along with a Y-gun depth charge projector forward of the aft deckhouse.

Engineering
As a somewhat experimental class, the Caldwells differed in their engineering. Conner and Stockton, built by Cramp, followed the class's original design, with three-shaft direct drive steam turbines. A high-pressure turbine on the center shaft exhausted to low-pressure turbines on the outboard shafts. A geared cruising turbine was provided on the center shaft for fuel economy at low and moderate speeds. The remaining ships had two shafts with geared turbines and no cruising turbines. With a further increase in horsepower, this geared turbine arrangement was adopted for the mass-production classes. Caldwell had an experimental "electric speed reducing gear" connecting the cruising turbines to the main turbines, a forerunner of the turbo-electric drive that would be used on several US battleships and aircraft carriers built from World War I through the 1920s.

Ships in class

References

Bibliography
 
 Gardiner, Robert, Conway's All the World's Fighting Ships 1906-1921, London: Conway Maritime Press, 1985. .
 Gardiner, Robert and Chesneau, Roger, Conway's All the World's Fighting Ships 1922-1946, London: Conway Maritime Press, 1980. .
 
 
Fitzsimons, Bernard, General Editor. The Encyclopedia of 20th Century Weapons and Warfare, Volume 5, pp. 510–11, "Caldwell", and Volume 16, pp. 1717–18, "Leeds". London: Phoebus, 1978.
 Silverstone, Paul H., U.S. Warships of World War I (Ian Allan, 1970), .
 Silverstone, Paul H., U.S. Warships of World War II (Ian Allan, 1965), .

External links

Caldwell-class destroyers at Destroyer History Foundation
Caldwell-class destroyers at Destroyers OnLine
Tin Can Sailors @ destroyers.org Caldwell class destroyer
DestroyerHistory.org Flush Decker page
DestroyerHistory.org USS Craven page
NavSource Destroyer Photo Index Page
DiGiulian, Tony Navweaps.com 4"/50 Mks 7, 8, 9, and 10
DiGiulian, Tony Navweaps.com Pre-WWII US Torpedoes
US Navy Torpedo History, part 2 

 
Destroyer classes